Amotion (stylized as aMOTION) is a DVD–CD set released by American rock band A Perfect Circle on November 16, 2004, only two weeks after the debut of the band's third album, eMOTIVe. The DVD consists of music videos for singles such as "Judith", "3 Libras" and "Weak and Powerless" as well as previously unreleased videos for singles such as "Blue" and "Thinking of You". The CD is composed entirely of remixes of the singles from Mer de Noms and Thirteenth Step. The songs were retooled by Danny Lohner, Joshua Eustis, Massive Attack, and James Iha among others. The video album debuted at number four on the SoundScan Top Music Video chart and number ten on the Australian music DVD chart. aMOTION was certified Platinum by the RIAA on 17 December 2004.

DVD track listing

CD track listing

Personnel
 Christopher Abbas – Director
 Josh Abrahams – Remixing
 Tim Alexander – Group member
 Ken Andrews – Mixing
 Wes Borland – Remixing
 Brothers Strause – Director
 Jerry Casale – Director
 Joshua Eustis – Drums, engineer, Fender Rhodes, remixing, mixing
 David Fincher – Director
 Jason Freese – Sax (baritone), sax (tenor)
 Josh Freese – Drums, group member
 Steven R Gilmore – Art direction, design, package design, cover design, sleeve art, poster design
 Billy Howerdel – Bass, guitar, programming, vocals, vocals (background), producer, engineer, photography, group member
 James Iha – Guitar, keyboards, remixing, group member
 Maynard James Keenan – Guitar, arranger, vocals, performer, executive producer, artwork, group member
 Mark Kohr – Director
 Paz Lenchantin – Piano, strings, vocals, acoustic guitar, performer, group member
 Luciano Lenchantin – Viola on "3 Libras"
 Danny Lohner – Arranger, vocals, multiple instruments, engineer, remixing, mixing, group member
 Robert Del Naja – Remixing
 Jeff Myers – Editing
 Geoff Sanoff – Remixing
 Branden Steineckert – Drums
 Paul Thiel – Director
 Troy Van Leeuwen – Guitar, remixing, group member
 Jeordie Osborne White – Bass, vocals (background), group member

Chart positions

This album has been released with the Copy Control protection system in some regions.

References

A Perfect Circle albums
2004 remix albums
Virgin Records remix albums
2004 compilation albums
Virgin Records compilation albums
Music video compilation albums